Exile is the twelfth studio album from American heavy metal band Demon Hunter, released through their self-founded record label, Weapons MFG, and the band's first concept album. It was announced for release in September 9, 2022, then delayed to October 28, 2022, due to supply chain issues.

Background
Six singles were released ahead of Exile, including “Silence the World”, “Defense Mechanism”, and “Godless”, featuring vocals from Tom S. Englund (Evergrey) and Max Cavalera (ex-Sepultura, Soulfly), and a guitar solo by Richie Faulkner (Judas Priest) respectively. It marks Faulkner's first studio recording since suffering an aortic rupture and dissection and subsequent 10-hour surgery. Among the track listing was a new recording of the song "Praise the Void", previously released in Demon Hunter's acoustic album Songs of Death and Resurrection a year prior. In conjunction with the album, a four-part comic series written by Ryan Clark was released, and in September the band embarked on an anniversary tour
celebrating 20 years since their official debut.

Chart performance
The album sold 6,400 copies in its first week, debuting at No. 200 on the Billboard 200, No. 1 of Top Christian Albums, No. 3 of Top Hard Rock Albums, No. 3 of Top Independent Albums, No. 4 of Top Rock Albums and No. 9 of Top Albums Sales.

Track listing 
 

The deluxe also includes six storyline interludes, complete with voiceovers and sound effects.

Personnel 
Demon Hunter
 Ryan Clark – lead vocals
 Patrick Judge – lead guitar, keys, programming
 Jeremiah Scott – rhythm guitar, backing vocals, production, engineering, mixing, programming
 Jon Dunn – bass guitar
 Timothy "Yogi" Watts – drums, backing vocals

Additional personnel
 Max Cavalera – additional vocals on "Defense Mechanism"
 Tom S. Englund – additional vocals on "Silence the World"
 Richie Faulkner – lead guitar and solo on "Godless"
 Zeuss – mastering
 Dan Seagrave – album artwork 
 Randy Torres – storyline interlude sound design (for Deluxe Edition)
 Joanna Ott - backing vocals and piano (Praise the Void)
 Samantha Philyaw – voice of Hunter Woodson (for Deluxe Edition sound interludes)
 Loren Tew – gang vocals

References 

Demon Hunter albums
2022 albums